The Jingguang Expressway is a  long urban express road in Zhengzhou, Henan, China.

History
The expressway was constructed in two phases.

The first phase, which is from North 3rd Ring Road to South 3rd Ring Road, was opened on 28 April 2012. The northern section (North 3rd Ring Road–Zhongyuan Road) is an elevated expressway built above Shakou Road while the southern section (Zhongyuan Road–South 3rd Ring Road) is mainly tunneled beneath Jingguang Road.

The second phase was finished in 2016. It is in elevated form and extends the expressway to Tianhe Road and G30 Lianhuo Expressway to the north and Zhengzhou Ring Expressway to the south.

Road conditions

Speed limit
The max speed limit is 60 km/h for the section between North 3rd Ring Road and South 3rd Ring Road, and 80 km/h for other sections.

Toll
This express road is toll-free.

Lanes
Main road:
 5 lanes (2 lanes for southbound and 3 lanes for northbound) on the section between North 3rd Ring Road and Zhongyuan Road.
 6 lanes (3 lanes for each direction) on other sections.

Exit list

From north to south:

References

Expressways in Henan
Transport in Henan
Expressways in Zhengzhou